Saint-Oyen is a village and comune in the Aosta Valley region of north-western Italy.

Geography
The village is bounded by Bourg-Saint-Pierre (Switzerland), Etroubles, Gignod and Saint-Rhémy-en-Bosses.

Twin towns
The village is twinned with Saint-Oyens in Switzerland.

Notes and references

Cities and towns in Aosta Valley